Ayapanopsis is a genus of flowering plants in the family Asteraceae.

Ayapanopsis is native to the Andes of South America, from southern Colombia to Argentina.

 Species

References

 Mabberley, D.J.(1997):The Plant-Book, 2nd Ed., Cambridge University Press, UK 

 
Asteraceae genera
Flora of South America
Taxonomy articles created by Polbot